Central Continental Prisoner of War Enclosure No. 32, code-named Ashcan, was an Allied prisoner-of-war camp in the Palace Hotel of Mondorf-les-Bains, Luxembourg during World War II. Operating from May to August 1945, it served as a processing station and interrogation center for the 86 most prominent surviving Nazi leaders prior to their trial in Nuremberg, including Hermann Göring and Karl Dönitz.

A British counterpart of Ashcan, Camp Dustbin in Castle Kransberg near Frankfurt am Main, housed prisoners of a more technical inclination including Albert Speer and Wernher von Braun.

History

The camp was established by order of Allied Command. It was commanded by U.S. Army Col. Burton C. Andrus, and staffed by men of the U.S. 391st Anti-Aircraft Battalion, Allied intelligence services and 42 German prisoners of war selected for their skills, including a barber, dentist, doctor and even a hotel manager.

The place selected for the camp was the Palace Hotel, a four-story luxury hotel dominating the small spa town, which had earlier in 1945 been used as a billet for U.S. troops. Security was so tight that even the MPs guarding the perimeter knew not what went on inside; they quipped that getting in required "a pass signed by God, and then somebody has to verify the signature". Conditions in the prison were spartan. The hotel furniture was replaced by Army cots and collapsible tables.

On 10 August 1945, the prisoners were transferred to Nuremberg to stand trial, and the camp was disbanded shortly afterwards. The building continued to serve as a hotel until 1988, when it was demolished to make way for a more modern spa.

Prisoners
Prisoners at Ashcan included most of the accused in the Nuremberg Trials along with many other senior Nazi Party, government and military officials such as:

 Reichsmarschall Hermann Göring, Commander-in-Chief of the Luftwaffe and Reich Air Minister
 Joachim von Ribbentrop, Reich Minister of Foreign Affairs
 Robert Ley, head of the German Labour Front
 Generalfeldmarschall Wilhelm Keitel, Chief of Staff of the Oberkommando der Wehrmacht
 Generaloberst Alfred Jodl, Chief of Operations of the Oberkommando der Wehrmacht
 Großadmiral Karl Dönitz, Commander-in-Chief of the Kriegsmarine and Reichspräsident
 Walther Funk, Reich Minister of the Economy and President of the Reichsbank
 Fritz Sauckel, General Plenipotentiary for Labour Deployment
 Hans Frank, General Governor of Poland
 Wilhelm Frick, Reich Minister of the Interior and Reich Protector of Bohemia-Moravia
 Arthur Seyß-Inquart, Reichskommissar of the Netherlands
 Julius Streicher, Gauleiter of Franconia and publisher of Der Stürmer
 Franz von Papen, Vice-Chancellor
 Alfred Rosenberg, Reich Minister for the Occupied Eastern Territories
 Johann Ludwig Graf Schwerin von Krosigk, Reich Minister of Finance and Chief Minister of the Flensburg government
 Richard Walther Darré, Reich Minister of Food and Agriculture
 Franz Seldte, Reich Minister of Labor
 Wilhelm Stuckart, State Secretary and later Reich Minister of the Interior
 Hans Lammers, Head of the Reich Chancellery
 Otto Meissner, Head of the Presidential Chancellery
 Kurt Daluege, Chief of the Ordnungspolizei (Order Police) and Deputy Reich Protector of Bohemia-Moravia
 Karl Brandt, Reich Commissioner for Sanitation and Health and co-head of the Aktion T4 euthenasia program
 Franz Ritter von Epp, Reichsstatthalter (Reich Governor) of Bavaria 
 Walter Buch, Chief of the Supreme Party Court
 Franz Xaver Schwarz, National Treasurer of the Nazi Party
 Ernst Wilhelm Bohle, Gauleiter for the Nazi Party/Foreign Organization
 Admiral Miklós Horthy, Regent of the Kingdom of Hungary
 Generalfeldmarschall Gerd von Rundstedt, Commander-in-Chief in the West
 Generalfeldmarschall Albert Kesselring, Commander-in-Chief in the South
 General of Artillery Walter Warlimont, Deputy Chief of Operations of the Oberkommando der Wehrmacht
 Albert Göring, brother of Hermann Göring, later released without charges

Footnotes

References

External link
 ASHCAN: Nazis, Generals and Bureaucrats as Guests at the Palace Hotel, Mondorf les Bains, Luxembourg, May-August 1945

World War II prisoner of war camps
Mondorf-les-Bains
Nuremberg trials